German submarine U-617 was a Type VIIC U-boat built for Nazi Germany's Kriegsmarine for service during World War II.
She was laid down on 31 May 1941 by Blohm & Voss in Hamburg as yard number 593, launched on 14 February 1942 and commissioned on 9 April under Kapitänleutnant Albrecht Brandi.

The boat's service began on 9 April 1942 with training as part of the 5th U-boat Flotilla. She was transferred to the 7th flotilla on 1 September 1942 and moved on to the 29th flotilla on 1 December 1942.

Design
German Type VIIC submarines were preceded by the shorter Type VIIB submarines. U-617 had a displacement of  when at the surface and  while submerged. She had two shafts and two  propellers.

U-617 was fitted with five  torpedo tubes (four fitted at the bow and one at the stern), fourteen torpedoes, one  SK C/35 naval gun, 220 rounds, and a  C/30 anti-aircraft gun. The boat had a complement of between forty-four and sixty.

Service history

Wolfpacks
In addition she took part in five wolfpacks, namely:
Pfeil (12 – 22 September 1942)
Blitz (22 – 26 September 1942)
Tiger (26 – 30 September 1942)
Delphin (4 – 10 November 1942)
Wal (10 – 15 November 1942)

Fate
She ran aground on 12 September 1943 at position  near Melilla after a sustained air attack by Leigh light-equipped RAF Wellington bombers from 179 Squadron.

All crew members were able to evacuate the stricken sub and subsequently interned by the Spanish authorities. They were later repatriated to Germany.

Summary of raiding history

References

Notes

Citations

Bibliography

External links

German Type VIIC submarines
U-boats commissioned in 1941
U-boats sunk in 1943
U-boats sunk by British aircraft
U-boats sunk by British warships
U-boats sunk by Australian warships
World War II submarines of Germany
World War II shipwrecks in the Mediterranean Sea
1941 ships
Ships built in Hamburg
Maritime incidents in September 1943